DD Meghalaya is a regional TV Public Service Broadcaster (under Prasar Bharati) which is available on Terrestrial as well as satellite mode.  DD Meghalaya TV Channel is now available on DD FreeDish Channel Number 104.

See also
 List of programs broadcast by DD National
 All India Radio
 Ministry of Information and Broadcasting
 DD Direct Plus
 List of South Asian television channels by country

References

External links
 Social site webpage link
 Doordarshan Official Internet site
 Doordarshan news site
 An article at PFC

Doordarshan
Foreign television channels broadcasting in the United Kingdom
Television channels and stations established in 1990
Indian direct broadcast satellite services